Ryo Sakakibara (榊原 諒, born August 4, 1985 in Takahama, Aichi) is a Japanese former professional baseball pitcher in Japan's Nippon Professional Baseball. He played for the Hokkaido Nippon-Ham Fighters from 2009 to 2013 and the Orix Buffaloes from 2014 to 2015.

External links

NBP

1985 births
Living people
People from Takahama, Aichi
Baseball people from Aichi Prefecture
Japanese baseball players
Nippon Professional Baseball pitchers
Hokkaido Nippon-Ham Fighters players
Orix Buffaloes players
Nippon Professional Baseball Rookie of the Year Award winners